Ged Wright is a visual effects artist. He was nominated at the 83rd Academy Awards for his work on the film Iron Man 2. This was in the category of Best Visual Effects. For which his nomination was shared with Janek Sirrs, Ben Snow and Dan Sudick. It lost to Inception.

Selected filmography

 Harry Potter and the Goblet of Fire (2005)
 Harry Potter and the Order of the Phoenix (2007)
 Quantum of Solace (2008)
 Iron Man 2 (2010)
 Man of Steel (2013)
 Insurgent (2015)

References

External links

Living people
Special effects people
Year of birth missing (living people)
Place of birth missing (living people)